Timothy Whites was a British chain of dispensing chemist and houseware stores.

History 

The origin of Timothy Whites was a ships' chandlers and general store in Portsmouth, started in 1848 by Timothy White. White himself qualified as a pharmacist in 1869. By 1890, Whites was one of four British pharmacists with over ten branches. Whites sold hardware as well as that which was normally found at a retail chemist's. In 1904 he had his company incorporated as Timothy Whites Ltd.

In 1935, Timothy Whites merged with Taylors Drug Co. Ltd. to form Timothy Whites & Taylors; the shops themselves were named either simply "Timothy Whites" or "Timothy Whites & Taylors". The company was taken over by Boots Pure Drug Co. in 1968. Immediately before the takeover, there were 614 Timothy Whites shops, which had had a combined turnover of approximately £33m in the year before the acquisition.  As a result of the rationalisation that followed the takeover, Boots rebranded and absorbed the pharmaceutical side of the business, leaving Timothy Whites with just 196 shops that sold only housewares. The Timothy Whites name eventually disappeared in 1985.

Notes

Retail companies established in 1848
Pharmacies of the United Kingdom
British brands
Pharmacy brands
Defunct retail companies of the United Kingdom
Companies based in Portsmouth
Home improvement companies of the United Kingdom
1848 establishments in the United Kingdom